Valeriy V. Chernyshev (born 25 September 1944 in Kemerovo, Soviet Union) is a Russian scientist in nitrogen chemistry.

Publications
"Structure analysis of the cubic boron nitride crystals", cited 23 times according to Google Scholar.

References

Russian chemists
1944 births
Living people
People from Kemerovo